The Vermont Transit Corridor is a proposed  bus rapid transit line in the Metro Busway network in Los Angeles, California with plans to convert it to a heavy rail subway line in the future. It is planned to operate on a north-to-south route on Vermont Avenue between the B Line's Vermont/Sunset station and the C Line's Vermont/Athens station on the Metro Rail system. The project feasibility study was released in February 2019 with a proposed completion date of 2028 for BRT and after 2067 for rail. It is part of Metro's Twenty-eight by '28 initiative and is partially funded by Measure M. The route will have signal priority at traffic lights and will have a dedicated right of way. Metro reports the initial cost is $425 million.

History

Until 1963, Vermont Avenue was served by several Los Angeles Railway Yellow Car streetcar lines: the F, K, R, S, U, and V. After streetcars ceased running under the Los Angeles Metropolitan Transit Authority, tracks were torn up, and buses replaced service.

 Vermont is the second busiest bus corridor in ridership, with 45,000 boarding per work day. Metro estimates this BRT will have 75,000-weekday boardings once completed. For that reason, light rail and subway options are also being developed. Metro is looking for ways to accelerate the option. Rail-based options are not scheduled to receive Measure R funds until after 2067.

Initial Alternative Analysis
Two alternative analyses were developed.

Bus rapid transit
Metro currently plans to construct bus rapid transit with various stations along its route. Metro will study three options for BRT:
"side running"
"side-center running"
A technical study will also look at an entirely "center-running" option.

These feasibility options were sent to formal environmental review status. Metro plans to commence the Draft Environmental Impact Report (DEIR) with the choices by 2019. Metro's planned budget for BRT is $425 million.

Rail
For rail, concepts have been published in the feasibility study. Measure M funds for rail are expected to become available after 2067.

The following concepts were published:
A light rail concept would cost $2.7 to 3.2 billion. Underground sections are required between Wilshire Boulevard and Slauson Avenue.
A heavy rail concept would cost $3.7 to 4.4 billion with five new underground stations. A new junction and platform under Wilshire/Vermont station would make the line a continuation of the B Line. This would feature a one-seat underground ride from North Hollywood to South Los Angeles.

Route
The corridor includes Vermont Avenue between Hollywood Boulevard and 120th Street. Destinations along the route include Exposition Park and its museums Lucas Museum of Narrative Art, the Natural History Museum and the California Science Center. Also, local sports stadiums, the Los Angeles Memorial Coliseum and the Banc of California Stadium. USC is along the route. It would also connect with E Line at Expo/Vermont station.

The following table shows potential BRT metro stations, per feasibility study from north to south. Also listed are existing light rail and subway stations.

South Bay Extension
Metro is also conducting a BRT, LRT, and HRT feasibility study to extend the route a further 10 miles past 120th Street south along Vermont Avenue to Ken Malloy Harbor Regional Park terminating at Pacific Coast Highway.

Close to Los Angeles Harbor College, Kaiser Permanente South Bay Medical Center, and Pacific Coast Highway station (J Line).

Study is scheduled to be released in Spring 2022.

References

External links
 Project site

Los Angeles County Metropolitan Transportation Authority
 Metro Rapid
Metro Rapid
Proposed railway lines in California
Transportation in Los Angeles
Los Angeles Metro Busway projects